Chrome Hoof are an experimental chamber rock orchestra based in London, England.  The group was formed in 2000 by Cathedral bassist Leo Smee and his brother Milo Smee.  Initially performing as a duo, their music was mostly electronic.  Since the start, however, the group have continuously recruited new members playing various instruments.  As of 2007, the group had about ten members and instruments such as saxophone, trumpet, bassoon, violin, guitars, bass and drums.

Being a large orchestra, Chrome Hoof's music spans several diverse music genres such as metal, electro, funk, jazz, disco and chamber music.  Their music has been described as progressive, futuristic and psychedelic.

Members
 Leo Smee – bass, vocals, synth', percussion
 Alex Thomas – drums, percussion
 Emmett Elvin – keyboards, synth', sampler
 Andy "Mr. Custard" Gustard – guitar, percussion
 James Sedwards – guitar
 Emma Sullivan – trumpet, vocals, keyboard, percussion
 Chloe Herington – bassoon, saxophone, percussion
 Sarah Anderson – violin, viola, percussion, backing vocals
 Shingai Shoniwa – vocals
 Chan Brown – backing vocals

Discography

Albums
 2004 – Chrome Hoof
 2007 – Pre-Emptive False Rapture
 2010 – Crush Depth
 2013 – Chrome Black Gold

EPs
 2006 – Beyond Zade

References

External links

Chrome Hoof on Twitter

Chrome Hoof statistics and tagging at Last.FM

Chrome Hoof at BBC Music
Chrome Hoof @ Elastic Artists Agency

English experimental musical groups
Musical groups from London
Cuneiform Records artists